The Home Song Stories is a 2007 Australian drama film written and directed by Tony Ayres, loosely based on aspects of his life. It stars Joan Chen, Joel Lok, Qi Yuwu, Irene Chen, Steven Vidler and Kerry Walker.

The film premiered at the 57th Berlin International Film Festival on 9 February 2007, and was released in Australia on 23 August 2007, by Dendy Films. It was announced as the Australian entry for the Foreign Language Film category of the Oscars, and received a total of nine nominations at the 2007 Inside Film Awards, winning five.

Plot
The film is an autobiographical account of Tony Ayres' life at age eight, however the names have been changed. The story is narrated by Darren Yap as an adult Tom typing the story on a computer and reflecting on the story "which defines them, which shapes who they are."  His mother Rose Hong was a nightclub singer in Hong Kong in 1964, where she met Bill, an Australian sailor, and married him to seek a better life in Australia, taking her daughter May and son Tom.  An opening montage of scenes shows Rose making several unsuccessful attempts to establish herself with Chinese partners before moving in with Bill again.

The story begins seven years after their initial migration to Australia, with the family returning to Bill's house in Melbourne.  Bill's mother, Norma, who is disapproving of the family, has moved in. When Bill leaves on a tour of duty, Rose and Norma struggle for control over the house. Soon, Rose begins to have an affair with Joe, the son of the local Chinese restaurateur, who is in his twenties. He moves in with Rose, who tells Norma he is her aunt's son. Rose and her children are eventually kicked out when Norma finds Joe in Rose's room.

Rose settles in with Joe after renting a place from a Chinese man. Their relationship begins to break down, and Rose attempts suicide, however May and Joe discover an affinity for each other which develops into a friendship. Rose, believing that May is trying to take Joe away from her, beats her and curses her. May, as a result, also attempts suicide and Rose also ends up in despair. However, the mother and daughter are reconciled in forgiveness as Rose tells May the story of the difficulties and traumatic experiences in her childhood, where she was forced into a marriage and lost her first two daughters.

The relationship between Rose and Joe collapses, and the family once again returns to Bill's home, with Norma moving out.  One afternoon when Tom is walking home with his classmate they encounter Rose in the front yard, and upon overhearing a conversation between two of his classmates bagging out Rose and her clothing, Tom blocks himself from his mother completely. Rose, in the meantime, has had her dream shattered, and is contemplating returning to Hong Kong when Tom abruptly tells her his apathy.

The film culminates in the adult Tom narrating, "Of all the things I remember about my childhood, this is what I remember the most."  The eight-year-old Tom wakes up early in the morning to see the light to the backyard shed on and enters to find that Rose has hanged herself. Although she does not die initially, Bill receives a phone call later on confirming her death.

The epilogue to the film shows the adult Tom and his sister May with her family (who happen to be Ayres' real life family) returning to Bill's home.  He narrates again, recalling how he never shed a tear for his mother, but instead, wrote the story fully to understand what has shaped him.

The real Tom, Tony Ayres, and his sister stayed with Bill after their mother's death. May ends up marrying the teacher who became their guardian soon after Bill's death.

Cast

Festivals
The Home Song Stories was selected to screen at the following film festivals:
2007 Berlin International Film Festival (8–18 February 2007)
2007 Adelaide Film Festival (22 February - 4 March 2007)
2007 Sydney Film Festival (8–24 June 2007)
2007 New Zealand International Film Festival (13 July - 28 November 2007)
2007 Bangkok International Film Festival (19–27 July 2007)
2007 Melbourne International Film Festival (25 July - 12 August 2007)
2007 Brisbane International Film Festival (2–12 August 2007)
2007 Edinburgh International Film Festival (15–26 August 2007)
2007 Toronto International Film Festival (9–15 September 2007))
2007 Calgary International Film Festival (20–30 September 2007)
2007 Hawaii International Film Festival (18–28 October 2007)
2007 International Eurasia Film Festival (19–28 October 2007)
2007 Cairo International Film Festival (27 November - 7 December 2007)
2007 Torino Film Festival (23 November - 1 December 2007)
2007 Asia Pacific Film Festival (13 November 2007)
2008 San Francisco International Asian American Film Festival (13–23 March 2008)
2008 Silk Screen Asian American Film Festival (9–18 May 2008)

Nominations
2007 Inside Film Awards
Best Feature Film
Best Director - Tony Ayres
Best Actor - Joel Lok
Best Actress - Joan Chen
Best Cinematography - Nigel Bluck
Best Music - Antony Partos
Best Script - Tony Ayres
Best Production Design - Melinda Doring
Best Sound - Craig Carter, John Wilkinson, James Harvey & Andrew Neil

2007 Australian Film Institute Awards
L'Oréal Paris AFI Award for Best Film
L'Oréal Paris AFI Young Actor Award - Joel Lok
L'Oréal Paris AFI Young Actor Award - Irene Chen
Macquarie Private Health AFI Award for Best Screenplay - Tony Ayres
Best Direction - Tony Ayres
Best Lead Actor - Qi Yuwu
Best Lead Actress - Joan Chen
Best Supporting Actress - Irene Chen
Best Cinematography - Nigel Bluck
Best Editing - Denise Haratzis ASE
Best Sound - Craig Carter, James Harvey, Andrew Neil & John Wilkinson
Best Original Music Score - Antony Partos
Best Production Design - Melinda Doring
Best Costume Design - Cappi Ireland

2007 Golden Horse Awards
Best Feature Film - "Home Song Stories"
Best Leading Actress - Joan Chen
Best Supporting Actor - Joel Lok
Best New Performer - Joel Lok
Best Original Screenplay - Tony Ayres
Best Art Direction - Melinda Doring
Best Makeup & Costume Design - Kirsten Veysey and Cappi Ireland

2007 Asia Pacific Screen Awards
Best Performance by an Actress - Joan Chen

Won
Brisbane International Film Festival
FIPRESCI International Jury Award

Hawaii International Film Festival
Halekulani Golden Orchid for Best Feature Film

Torino International Film Festival
Best Actress - Joan Chen

2007 Inside Film Awards
Best Director - Tony Ayres
Best Actor - Joel Lok
Best Actress - Joan Chen
Best Cinematography - Nigel Bluck
Best Production Design - Melinda Doring

2007 Australian Film Institute Awards
 Best Direction - Tony Ayres
 Best Lead Actress - Joan Chen
 Best Screenplay - Tony Ayres
 Best Cinematography - Nigel Bluck
 Best Editing - Denise Haratzis
 Best Original Music Score - Antony Partos
 Best Production Design – Melinda Doring
 Best Costume Design – Cappi Ireland

2007 Golden Horse Awards
 Best Actress - Joan Chen
 Best Original Screenplay - Tony Ayres

2007 New South Wales Premier's Literary Awards
 Script Writing Award

Box office
The Home Song Stories grossed $452,488 at the box office in Australia.

See also
Cinema of Australia

References

External links
 
 

2007 films
2007 biographical drama films
2007 multilingual films
2000s Cantonese-language films
2000s English-language films
2000s Mandarin-language films
Australian biographical drama films
Australian multilingual films
Autobiographical films
Films directed by Tony Ayres
Films produced by Liz Watts
Films set in Melbourne
Films shot in Melbourne
Films about mother–son relationships
Films about suicide